Kirill Ivanov (born January 14, 1960, in Leningrad) is a Russian sport shooter. He competed in rifle shooting events at the Summer Olympics in 1988 and 1992. In 1988, he won the bronze medal in the men's 50 metre rifle three positions event. Currently, he is coaching the Singapore Shooting Team.

Olympic results

References

1960 births
Living people
ISSF rifle shooters
Russian male sport shooters
Soviet male sport shooters
Shooters at the 1988 Summer Olympics
Shooters at the 1992 Summer Olympics
Medalists at the 1988 Summer Olympics
Olympic shooters of the Soviet Union
Olympic shooters of the Unified Team
Olympic bronze medalists for the Soviet Union
Olympic medalists in shooting